Glacial motion is the motion of glaciers, which can be likened to rivers of ice. It has played an important role in sculpting many landscapes. Most lakes in the world occupy basins scoured out by glaciers.

Processes of motion
Glacier motion occurs from four processes, all driven by gravity: basal sliding, glacial quakes generating fractional movements of large sections of ice, bed deformation, and internal deformation.
 In the case of basal sliding, the entire glacier slides over its bed. This type of motion is enhanced if the bed is soft sediment, if the glacier bed is thawed and if meltwater is prevalent.
 Bed deformation is thus usually limited to areas of sliding. Seasonal melt ponding and penetrating under glaciers shows seasonal acceleration and deceleration of ice flows affecting whole icesheets.
 Some glaciers experience glacial quakes—glaciers "as large as Manhattan and as tall as the Empire State Building, can move 10 meters in less than a minute, a jolt that is sufficient to generate moderate seismic waves." There has been an increasing pattern of these ice quakes - "Quakes ranged from six to 15 per year from 1993 to 2002, then jumped to 20 in 2003, 23 in 2004, and 32 in the first 10 months of 2005." A glacier that is frozen up to its bed does not experience basal sliding.
 Internal deformation occurs when the weight of the ice causes the deformation of ice crystals. This takes place most readily near the glacier bed, where pressures are highest.  There are glaciers that primarily move via sliding, glacial quakes, and others that move almost entirely through deformation.

Terminus movement and mass balance   
If a glacier's terminus moves forward faster than it melts, the net result is advance. Glacier retreat occurs when more material ablates from the terminus than is replenished by flow into that region.

Glaciologists consider that trends in mass balance for glaciers are more fundamental than the advance or retreat of the termini of individual glaciers. In the years since 1960, there has been a striking decline in the overall volume of glaciers worldwide. This decline is correlated with global warming. As a glacier thins, due to the loss of mass it will slow down and crevassing will decrease.

Landscape and geology
Studying glacial motion and the landforms that result requires tools from many different disciplines: physical geography, climatology, and geology are among the areas sometime grouped together and called earth science.

During the Pleistocene (the last ice age), huge sheets of ice called continental glaciers advanced over much of the earth. The movement of these continental glaciers created many now-familiar glacial landforms. As the glaciers were expanded, due to their accumulating weight of snow and ice, they crushed and redistributed surface rocks, creating erosional landforms such as striations, cirques, and hanging valleys. Later, when the glaciers retreated leaving behind their freight of crushed rock and sand, depositional landforms were created, such as moraines, eskers, drumlins, and kames. The stone walls found in New England (northeastern United States) contain many glacial erratics, rocks that were dragged by a glacier many miles from their bedrock origin.

At some point, if an Alpine glacier becomes too thin it will stop moving.  This will result in the end of any basal erosion. The stream issuing from the glacier will then become clearer as glacial flour diminishes. Lakes and ponds can also be caused by glacial movement. Kettle lakes form when a retreating glacier leaves behind an underground chunk of ice. Moraine-dammed lakes occur when a stream (or snow runoff) is dammed by glacial till.

See also
 Cryoseism
 Glacial earthquake
 Glacial lake outburst flood

References

External links
 How glaciers form and flow
 Trends in glacier mass balance 
 Animation of glacial advance
 Advance and retreat of Columbia Glacier in Prince William Sound
 Physical geography of glacial landforms
 Links to more glacier resources online
 North Cascade Glacier Climate Project Research

Glaciology